Polytope de Montréal was a media installation in the French Pavilion, which now houses the Montreal Casino. The installation included a sculpture, light show, and musical composition designed and composed by Iannis Xenakis, for the opening of the Ottawa Art Gallery following Expo 67. The piece is one of many polytopes (flat-sided geometric object, e.g., polyhedron) by Xenakis.

The light sculpture consisted of "a geometric array of steel cables stretching up through the multi-tiered atrium of the building, with 1,200 flashbulbs attached to the cables."

The piece led to the commission of Kraanerg.

Sources

External links
Oswalt, Phillipp (1991). "Iannis Xenakisis' Polytopes", Oswalt.de.
"Réalisations architecturales", Iannis-Xenakis.org.

1967 compositions
Buildings and structures in Montreal
Compositions by Iannis Xenakis
Spatial music
Expo 67